Phaeovirus is a genus of viruses, in the family Phycodnaviridae. Alga serve as natural hosts. There are nine species in this genus.

Taxonomy
The genus contains the following species:
 Ectocarpus fasciculatus virus a
 Ectocarpus siliculosus virus 1
 Ectocarpus siliculosus virus a
 Feldmannia irregularis virus a
 Feldmannia species virus
 Feldmannia species virus a
 Hincksia hinckiae virus a
 Myriotrichia clavaeformis virus a
 Pilayella littoralis virus 1

Structure

Viruses in Phaeovirus are enveloped, with icosahedral and round geometries, and T=169 symmetry. The diameter is around 120-150 nm. Genomes are linear, around 150-350kb in length.

Life cycle
Viral replication is nucleo-cytoplasmic, and is lysogenic. Replication follows the DNA strand displacement model. DNA-templated transcription is the method of transcription. The virus exits the host cell by lysis via lytic phospholipids. Alga serve as the natural host. Transmission routes are passive diffusion.

References

External links
 Viralzone: Phaeovirus
 ICTV

Phycodnaviridae
Virus genera